Tikdar (also Romanized as Tīkdar; also known as Tidar, Tīdar-e Deh Zīār, Tīgdar, and Tikdar Deh Ziyar) is a village in Kavirat Rural District, Chatrud District, Kerman County, Kerman Province, Iran. At the 2006 census, its population was 469, in 116 families.

References 

Populated places in Kerman County